Joro spider toxin (joro toxin, JSTX) - a toxin which was originally extracted from the venom of the joro spider (Trichonephila clavata), originally native to Japan.

Biochemical analysis
Joro toxin has demonstrated the ability to selectively block
 postsynaptic glutamate potentials and 
 AMPA glutamate receptors.
It inhibits 
 NMDA receptors in the CNS of vertebrates.

Joro toxin does not affect
 aspartate-induced neural depolarization,
 resting membrane potential,
 nerve terminal spontaneous signalling, or
 inhibitory postsynaptic potentials.

Sources

References 
 

Spider toxins